Ballinluig (Gaelic: Baile an Luig) is a village in Perth and Kinross, Scotland. It developed with the building of the Highland Railway, and sat where a branch line went off to Aberfeldy, both the branch line and Ballinluig station were closed in 1965.

References

Villages in Perth and Kinross